Gaston Lamotte was a French athlete.  He competed at the 1908 Summer Olympics in London. In the 100 metres, Lamotte took third place in his first round heat and did not advance to the semifinals.

References

External links

Sources
 
 
 

Olympic athletes of France
Athletes (track and field) at the 1908 Summer Olympics
French male sprinters
1886 births
1964 deaths